Voice Farm is a musical group and video collective based in San Francisco. Vocalist Charly Brown and sound designer Myke Reilly form the core of the group, who met in 1980.
Voice Farm's musical style has evolved from their influential early-1980s synth-pop sound. In 1991 they released a hit single, "Free Love". A fascination with popular culture and media continue to fuel Voice Farm's creative projects, including videos that they have on their website. Guitarist Ken Weller and back-up singer Marilynn Fowler are featured on the group's latest album, entitled Super Nova Experts (2009).

A Voice Farm song ("Sleep") appears on the Let Them Eat Jellybeans compilation.

Discography

Studio albums
The World We Live In (1982)
Voice Farm (1987)
Bigger Cooler Weirder (1991)
The Love Experiment (1995)
Super Nova Experts (2009)

Singles 
"Sleep" B/W "Modern Things" (1981)
"Double Garage" B/W "Elevate" (1981)
Free Love (1991)

References

External links
 Voice Farm's Official site

American new wave musical groups
Musical groups from San Francisco